Ccorca District is one of eight districts of the Cusco Province in Peru.

Geography 
Other mountains are listed below:

References